My Friends & Me is a studio album by American singer Dionne Warwick. It was released by Concord Records on November 7, 2006 in the United States. Produced by Warwick's son Damon Elliott, the album is a collection of duets with other artists on re-recordings of past songs by Warwick.

Critical reception

Allmusic editor John Bush wrote that Warwick's son and chief producer Damon Elliott's "production for this record is engaging and charming, right up to the minute digitally on the rhythm end, but with plenty of space within the tracks to echo the airy productions of Warwick's long-time producer, Burt Bacharach. Also, Elliott kept most of these versions piano-based and added a tight backing chorus that is virtually necessary for anyone familiar with the original "Walk On By" or "Anyone Who Had a Heart." Dionne Warwick's voice, however, hasn't aged as well as her contemporaries, and the record often resembles a tribute album whose subject only stops by occasionally (More often than not, the guests are featured more than Warwick herself)."

Track listing 
All tracks produced by Damon Elliott and co-produced by Teddy Harmon.

Personnel 
 Dionne Warwick – liner notes, executive producer
 Grecco Buratto – guitar
 John Burk – producer, executive producer
 Ariel Chobaz – mixing
 Damon Elliott – drums, keyboards, producer, programming, engineer, executive producer
 Brian "Big Bass" Gardener – mastering
 Teddy Harmon – bass, keyboards, producer, programming
 Jaysen Joshua – assistant engineer
 Ari Levine – assistant engineer
 Len Peltier – package design
 Dave Pensado – mixing
 David Vance – photography

Charts

References 

2006 albums
Vocal duet albums
Dionne Warwick albums
Concord Records albums